Marguerite La Caze (born 1964) is an Australian philosopher and Associate Professor of Philosophy at the University of Queensland.
She is an Australian Research Fellow and a former Chair of the Australasian Society for Continental Philosophy (2010–2013).
La Caze is known for her research on feminist philosophy and aesthetics.

Bibliography

 
 
 La Caze, Marguerite (2000), "Analytic Imaginary" in 
 La Caze, Marguerite (2000), "Sublimation, love and creativity" in 
 
 
 Integrity and the fragile self, Ashgate, 2003
 
 La Caze, Marguerite (2004), "If you say so: feminist philosophy and antiracism" in 
 La Caze, Marguerite (2006), "Splitting the difference: between Young and Fraser on identity politics" in 
 La Caze, Marguerite (2011), "A Taste for Fashion" in 
 La Caze, Marguerite (2011), "Existentialism, Feminism and Sexuality" in 
 La Caze, Marguerite (2011), "The Miraculous Power of Forgiveness and the Promise" in

References

External links
 Marguerite La Caze at the University of Queensland

Australian philosophers
Continental philosophers
Philosophy academics
Living people
Academic staff of the University of Queensland
Presidents of the Australasian Society for Continental Philosophy
Philosophers of art
University of Queensland alumni
University of Melbourne alumni
Feminist philosophers
Australian non-fiction writers
21st-century Australian women writers
21st-century Australian writers
1964 births